The 2021 Tunisian protests are a series of protests that started on 15 January 2021. Thousand of people rioted in cities and towns across Tunisia, which saw looting and arson as well as mass deployment of police and army in several cities and the arrest of hundreds of demonstrators.

The protests started in the town of Siliana, northwestern Tunisia, following the municipal police aggression of a shepherd.

Young people clashed with police for the fifth straight night on 19 January. In response, Prime Minister Hichem Mechichi appealed to the protesters on national television, stating “Your voice is heard, and your anger is legitimate, and it is my role and the role of the government to work to realize your demands and to make the dream of Tunisia to become true.”

On 21 January, Tunisia reported 103 COVID-19–related deaths, the highest figure to date in the country, among the highest rates in Africa. On 23 January, the government extended its health curfew and banned demonstrations. Travel between regions was banned, bars and restaurants were closed except for take-out food, and university classes were transferred online.

See also

 2021 in North Africa
 COVID-19 pandemic in Tunisia
 June 2013 Egyptian protests

References

2021 riots
Looting in Africa
Tunisia
January 2021 crimes in Africa
Protests in Tunisia
2018–2022 Arab protests
2021 protests
Protests over responses to the COVID-19 pandemic